Jacob Lillyman (born 7 March 1984) is an Australian former professional rugby league footballer.

Early years
Lillyman was born in Richmond, Queensland, Australia.

Lillyman attended Columba Catholic College, Charters Towers, where he was a boarding student for a while. His youth club was the Richmond Tigers in Northwest Queensland.

While attending Kirwan State High School, Lillyman played for the Australian Schoolboys team in 2002.

Playing career

Cowboys
Lillyman made his debut for the Cowboys in Round 22 of the 2003 season against the Newcastle Knights. He then went on to play sixty two games for the club, showing good enough form to earn State of Origin selection.

In 2008 Lillyman was forced to leave the North Queensland Cowboys due to salary-cap pressures, and  that year there ended abruptly for him when he suffered a season-ending injury in Round 15, playing against the Melbourne Storm.

Warriors
In June 2008, it was announced that he had signed a two-year deal with the New Zealand Warriors for the 2009 and 2010 seasons. At that time he was joining a strong Queensland contingent at the club, which included former Cowboys Nathan Fien and Micheal Luck and well as fellow State representatives Steve Price and Brent Tate. In August 2010 he signed a one-year extension and a further two-year extension followed in May 2011 when Lillyman re-signed for the Warriors until the end of the 2013 season In April 2014 he re-signed until the end of the 2017 season, which would make it a straight nine years with the club. On 3 April 2016 Lillyman became the 11th player to mark 150 games for the Warriors in their 32-28 win over the Sydney Roosters at Gosford, NSW, making 159 metres, with 31 tackles.

Knights
After 188 games with the Warriors, Lillyman decided it was time to return to Australia, signing a 1-year contract with the Newcastle Knights starting in 2018.

In round 1 of the 2018 season, Lillyman made his debut for the Knights in their 19-18 golden point extra-time win over the Manly Warringah Sea Eagles.

In August 2018, he announced he would be retiring at the end of the 2018 season.

Representative career
Lillyman made his State of Origin debut for Queensland on 14 June 2006 coming off the bench in the 53rd minute. Lillyman was recalled to the Queensland State of Origin team for the first match on the 2011 series.

In the week leading up to Game II of the 2013 State of Origin series, it was announced that Lillyman would replace injured Sydney Roosters forward Martin Kennedy as the 18th man for Queensland in the next game of the series, marking his return to representative football.

Lillyman played for Queensland in games two and three of the 2014 State of Origin series and in all three of the 2015 State of Origin series.

A week before Game II of the 2016 State of Origin series, it was announced that Lillyman would replace injured Manly Warringah Sea Eagles prop Nate Myles for Queensland in the next game of the series.

References

External links
Newcastle Knights profile

1984 births
Living people
Australian rugby league players
New Zealand Warriors players
North Queensland Cowboys players
Newcastle Knights players
People from North Queensland
People educated at Kirwan State High School
Queensland Rugby League State of Origin players
Rugby league players from Queensland
Rugby league second-rows
Rugby league props